Euphorbia crenulata is a species of spurge native to the western United States, especially California and Oregon. Its common name is Chinese caps. Its leaves vary in shape and size but they often curve up and come together to form a bowl shape. The small fruits are green, fleshy, and lobed. The flower has two distinct horns.

External links
Jepson Manual Treatment of Euphorbia crenulata
Timetotrack.com: Close up photo
Euphorbia crenulata — UC Photos gallery

crenulata
Flora of California
Flora of Oregon
Flora of the Cascade Range
Flora of the Klamath Mountains
Flora of the Sierra Nevada (United States)
Natural history of the California chaparral and woodlands
Natural history of the Central Valley (California)
Natural history of the Peninsular Ranges
Natural history of the San Francisco Bay Area
Natural history of the Transverse Ranges
Flora without expected TNC conservation status